The Brilliance V5 is a compact CUV produced by Brilliance Auto under the Zhonghua brand. The Brilliance V5 was unveiled on the 2011 Guangzhou Auto Show in China with prices ranging from 109,800 to 165,800 yuan.

The vehicle gained notoriety in Western car enthusiast circles for its decidedly Shanzhai exterior design, which is heavily, if not directly, copied off BMW X1 (E84), despite Brilliance also produced genuine X1 E84 (from 2016, F49) for Chinese markets through BMW Brilliance joint venture.

2014 facelift

A facelift for the Brilliance V5 CUV happened in 2014, and it debuted on the April 2014 Beijing Auto Show. The facelift includes a new grille, new headlights, new taillights, and new front and rear bumpers.

References

External links 

 Brilliance V5 Official

V5
Compact sport utility vehicles
Front-wheel-drive vehicles
Crossover sport utility vehicles
Cars of China

Cars introduced in 2011